Jorge Ángelo Paleso Carbajal (born July 24, 1983 in Santa Lucía), commonly known as Ángelo Paleso, is a Uruguayan footballer, who currently plays for Wanderers de Santa Lucía.

Career 
Carbajal began his career with CA Peñarol and joined for the start of his senior career 2005 to Miramar Misiones. He played during his four and a half years 161 games for his club Miramor and scored once.

On 27 June 2011 after a successful trial with Belgium side C.S. Visé, signed a one year contract with the club. The contract with the defensive midfielder was on 26 January 2012 resigned and he joined to German Verbandsliga Niederrhein club 1. FC Bocholt.

In August 2012, he signed a new deal with Uruguayan Segunda División side Sud América.
Now he plays for Santa Lucía FC, a local foto Ball team known as "El Santa".

References

External links
 

Living people
1983 births
People from Santa Lucía, Uruguay
Uruguayan footballers
Association football midfielders
Miramar Misiones players
C.S. Visé players
Sud América players
Expatriate footballers in Belgium
Expatriate footballers in Germany